Masuzoa is a genus of beetles in the family Carabidae, containing the following species:

 Masuzoa baicalensis Shilenkov & Anichtchenko, 2008
 Masuzoa notabilis Ueno, 1960
 Masuzoa ussuriensis Lafer, 1989

References

Trechinae